Sayer's Croft is a   Local Nature Reserve  west of Ewhurst in Surrey. It is owned by the  Sayer's Croft Environmental Education Trust and managed by Surrey County Council.

This nature reserve is on land belonging to Sayers Croft outdoor educational centre. It has diverse habitats, including broadleaved woodland, grassland, marsh, open water, tall herb and tall fen.

There is access by a footpath from The Street and from the Sayers Croft Centre of Cranleigh Road.

References

External links
Sayers Croft

Local Nature Reserves in Surrey